This article shows the 2012 season of South Korean football.

National team results

Senior team

Under-23 team

K League

Korean FA Cup

Korea National League

Regular season

Championship playoffs

WK League

Table

Playoff and championship
The playoff is played one leg and championship final is played over two legs.

AFC Champions League

South Korean clubs' score displayed first

References

External links

 
Seasons in South Korean football